Today is the twenty-second studio album by American singer Elvis Presley, released on May 7, 1975 by RCA Records. The album featured the country and pop music sound typical of Elvis during the 1970s, as well as a new rock and roll song, "T-R-O-U-B-L-E", which was released as its first single and went Top 40 in the US. "Bringing It Back" was its second single in the US. The album also features covers of songs by Perry Como, Tom Jones, The Pointer Sisters, Billy Swan, Faye Adams, The Statler Brothers and Charlie Rich.

Content 
The Today sessions were held in RCA's Studio C, Hollywood, Los Angeles, California, March 10–12, 1975, and marked the last time Presley would record in a studio. He last recorded at Studio C, Hollywood in 1972 where he recorded the gold records "Burning Love" and "Separate Ways". At this time, Elvis was 40 years old. He was accompanied by his then-current girlfriend, Sheila Ryan. In the 2005 Follow That Dream reissue of the album, Presley can be heard saying "step up here Sheila, let me sing to ya baby" on Take 1 of Don McLean's "And I Love You So". He continued to make "And I Love You So" and "Fairytale" a part of his live concerts until his death. On stage, he often referred to "Fairytale" as the story of his life.

"Green, Green Grass of Home" was released as a single in the UK, where it went Top 30, and also received US airplay. Presley was a big fan of Tom Jones' version of the song; while travelling, he would repeatedly have his friends call the local radio stations to request it.

Reissues 
In 2005 Today was reissued on the Follow That Dream label in a special edition that contained the original album tracks along with a selection of alternate takes.

Track listing

Original release

Follow That Dream re-issue

2015 reissue

Disc 1 
Same as Follow That Dream 2005 issue

Disc 2 
All tracks previously unissued

Personnel

References

External links 

APL1-1039 Today Guide part of The Elvis Presley Record Research Database
APD1-1039 Today Guide part of The Elvis Presley Record Research Database
Rolling Stone review by Dave Marsh, July 3, 1975

1975 albums
Elvis Presley albums
Albums produced by Felton Jarvis
RCA Records albums